Thirumalaipatty is a major municipality in the Namakkal District, in the southern state of  Tamil Nadu, India. It is 8 km east of Pudhansandai (NH-7) and 7 km west of Kalappanaickenpatti and 8 km north Singalandhapuram. The name Thirumalaipatti has it root from "Three Hills".

History 
The name of Thirumalaipatti has been formed by surrounding the hills. The people of this village have strong culture and traditions.

Geography 
Thirumalaipatti is closely located in Namakkal by 20 km and Salem by 44 km.

Kolli Hills foot hill is just 20 km from this village.

Climate and places 
This village is cool and the climate changes depending upon the occasion. Agriculture is the village's main activity. Thirumalaipatti contains following areas:
Earulapattipudhur
Edayapatty
Kummanaickanoor
Melapatti
Muthunaickanoor
Namanaickanoor
Palapatty
Periyakalani
Pudhuvellantheru
Senguttai
Seniyankadu
Solaiudayampatty
Thammanaickanoor
Therkukottai
Thetukadu
Thevaipatty
Thoppur
Vannamparai

How to reach

By bus 
From Namakkal: 14 -A, 23, 4 (Jothi)
From Rasipuram: 7 (SST)
From Pudhansandai: 23, 52

By train 
Kalangani (6 km)
Namakkal (23 km)
Salem (44 km)

By airport 
Salem Airport (63 km)
Tiruchirapalli Airport (112 km)
Coimbatore Airport (161 km)

Public facilities 
 Nursery and Higher Secondary Schools
 Public Health Center (government hospital)
 Government Veterinary hospital
 Sub-Post Office
 Branch Library
 Indian Overseas Bank 
 Salem Co-Operative Bank
 Tamil Nadu Electricity Board 
 Co-Operative Agriculture Bank

Places of worship

Temples

Nainamalai Temple 
From Thirumalaipatty to the temple is the easiest way to reach the temple.

By ten miles north-east of Namakkal, contains a Vishnu temple on the top of the hill, which is said to have been built by Poligar Ramachandra Nayaka. The temple is dedicated to Varadaraja and is regarded with special veneration by the people in the District  who visit it in large numbers on Saturdays in Purattasi (September–October). The hill is claimed to be the abode of the Sage Kanvar, the foster father of Sakuntala, the heroine of the well-known drama, "Sakuntala or the Lost Ring". But several villages in the ceded districts in the Andhra Pradesh claim the same honour.

Though the village is an uninhabited, the weekly shandy that meets on Wednesdays is one of the biggest in the district fetching an income of Rs.8,000 per year to the panchayat union. It attracts many people for the sale and purchase of many sheep and bulls besides the produce of the Kollimalais such as plantains, bamboos, cholam, cotton, cumbu, thinai, and coir goods. The shandy is held within the limits of Minnampalli village on the 24th mile from Salem on the National Highways to Namakkal. The hill which is claimed as the abode of Sage Kanvar, the foster father of Sakunthala, the mother of Bharatha, has a temple on the top dedicated to Varadaraja which attracts many pilgrims on the four Saturdays of the Tamil month Purattasai (September–October).

References

Villages in Namakkal district